This is a list of public transport authorities in Pennsylvania.

References

Public transportation in Pennsylvania
Government of Pennsylvania
Pennsylvania transportation-related lists